Bisiach is a family name of Italian origin. It may refer to:

 Carlo Bisiach (1892–1968), Italian violin maker
 Gianni Bisiach (1927–2022), Italian journalist and writer
 Leandro Bisiach (1864–1945), Italian violin maker

Italian-language surnames